This is a list of cases reported in volume 17 (4 Wheat.) of United States Reports, decided by the Supreme Court of the United States in 1819.

Nominative reports 
In 1874, the U.S. government created the United States Reports, and retroactively numbered older privately-published case reports as part of the new series.  As a result, cases appearing in volumes 1–90 of U.S. Reports have dual citation forms; one for the volume number of U.S. Reports, and one for the volume number of the reports named for the relevant reporter of decisions (these are called "nominative reports").

Henry Wheaton 
Starting with the 14th volume of U.S. Reports, the Reporter of Decisions of the Supreme Court of the United States was Henry Wheaton. Wheaton was Reporter of Decisions from 1816 to 1827, covering volumes 14 through 25 of United States Reports which correspond to volumes 1 through 12 of his Wheaton's Reports. As such, the dual form of citation to, for example, McCulloch v. Maryland is 17 U.S. (4 Wheat.) 316 (1819).

Justices of the Supreme Court at the time of 17 U.S. (4 Wheat.) 

The Supreme Court is established by Article III, Section 1 of the Constitution of the United States, which says: "The judicial Power of the United States, shall be vested in one supreme Court . . .". The size of the Court is not specified; the Constitution leaves it to Congress to set the number of justices. Under the Judiciary Act of 1789 Congress originally fixed the number of justices at six (one chief justice and five associate justices). Since 1789 Congress has varied the size of the Court from six to seven, nine, ten, and back to nine justices (always including one chief justice).

When the cases in 17 U.S. (4 Wheat.) were decided, the Court comprised these seven justices:

Notable Cases in 17 U.S. (4 Wheat.)

McCulloch v. Maryland 
McCulloch v. Maryland, 17 U.S. (4 Wheat.) 316 (1819), is a landmark U.S. Supreme Court decision that defined the scope of the U.S. Congress's legislative power and how it relates to the powers of American state legislatures. The dispute in McCulloch involved the legality of the national bank and a tax that the state of Maryland imposed on it. In its ruling, the Supreme Court established that the "Necessary and Proper" Clause of the U.S. Constitution gives the U.S. federal government certain implied powers that are not explicitly enumerated in the Constitution, and that the American federal government is supreme over the states, and so states' ability to interfere with the federal government is limited.

Sturges v. Crowninshield 
Sturges v. Crowninshield, 17 U.S. (4 Wheat.) 122 (1819), dealt with the constitutionality of New York having passed bankruptcy laws and retroactively applying them.

Dartmouth College v. Woodward 
Dartmouth College v. Woodward, 17 U.S. (4 Wheat.) 518 (1819), is a landmark decision in United States corporate law from the United States Supreme Court dealing with the application of the Contracts Clause of the United States Constitution to private corporations. The case arose when the president of Dartmouth College was deposed by its trustees, leading to the New Hampshire legislature attempting to force the college to become a public institution, and so place the ability to appoint trustees in the hands of the governor of New Hampshire. The Supreme Court upheld the durability of the original charter of the college, which pre-dated the creation of the State.

Citation style 

Under the Judiciary Act of 1789 the federal court structure at the time comprised District Courts, which had general trial jurisdiction; Circuit Courts, which had mixed trial and appellate (from the US District Courts) jurisdiction; and the United States Supreme Court, which had appellate jurisdiction over the federal District and Circuit courts—and for certain issues over state courts. The Supreme Court also had limited original jurisdiction (i.e., in which cases could be filed directly with the Supreme Court without first having been heard by a lower federal or state court). There were one or more federal District Courts and/or Circuit Courts in each state, territory, or other geographical region.

Bluebook citation style is used for case names, citations, and jurisdictions.  
 e.g.,"C.C.D.N.J." = United States Circuit Court for the District of New Jersey
 e.g.,"D. Mass." = United States District Court for the District of Massachusetts 
 "E." = Eastern; "M." = Middle; "N." = Northern; "S." = Southern; "W." = Western
 e.g.,"C.C.S.D.N.Y." = United States Circuit Court for the Southern District of New York
 e.g.,"M.D. Ala." = United States District Court for the Middle District of Alabama
 "Ct. Cl." = United States Court of Claims
 The abbreviation of a state's name alone indicates the highest appellate court in that state's judiciary at the time. 
 e.g.,"Pa." = Supreme Court of Pennsylvania
 e.g.,"Me." = Supreme Judicial Court of Maine

List of cases in 17 U.S. (4 Wheat.)  

NOTE: Some decisions have alternate pagination, indicated by "{ }."

Notes and references

See also
 certificate of division

External links
  Case reports in volume 17 (4 Wheat.) from Court Listener
  Case reports in volume 17 (4 Wheat.) from the Caselaw Access Project of Harvard Law School
  Case reports in volume 17 (4 Wheat.) from Google Scholar
  Case reports in volume 17 (4 Wheat.) from Justia
  Case reports in volume 17 (4 Wheat.) from Open Jurist
 Website of the United States Supreme Court
 United States Courts website about the Supreme Court
 National Archives, Records of the Supreme Court of the United States
 American Bar Association, How Does the Supreme Court Work?
 The Supreme Court Historical Society

1819 in United States case law